Wallajah Road in Chennai, Tamil Nadu, India branches off from Anna Salai. It is one of the major link roads in Chennai, connecting Anna Salai and Rajaji Salai, Chennai. It starts from the Arignar Anna Statue (Wallajah Road Junction) and reaches Marina Beach at Rajaji Salai. The new State guest house being constructed in Omandurar Government Estate is nearing completion in February 2016.

Major companies and organizations located at this road includes

 Tamil Nadu Government Multi Super Speciality Hospital
 Government Medical College at 'B' Block
 Tamil Nadu Tourism Development Corporation Headquarters
 Narayanas Arihant Ocean Tower
 Channel UFX
 Kalaivanar Arangam
 State Guest House
 M. A. Chidambaram Stadium
 Chepauk railway station
 University of Madras

References

Roads in Chennai